The Prince and the Beggarmaid is a 1921 British silent drama film directed by A. V. Bramble and starring Henry Ainley, Kathleen Vaughan and Harvey Braban. It was based on a play by Walter Howard.

Cast
 Henry Ainley - Prince Olaf
 Kathleen Vaughan - Princess Monika
 Harvey Braban - King Hildred
 Sam Wilkinson - Prince Michael
 Sidney Paxton - Chief of State
 John Wyndham - Captain Karsburg
 Laurence Forster - General Erlenberg
 Francis Duguid - Captain Schway
 Frank Woolf - Captain Hector

References

External links
 

1921 films
British drama films
British silent feature films
Films directed by A. V. Bramble
1921 drama films
British films based on plays
Ideal Film Company films
British black-and-white films
1920s English-language films
1920s British films
Silent drama films